Nonthawat Klinchampasri (born 10 March 1997), is a Thai professional footballer who plays as a midfielder  for Thai League 3 club Hua Hin City (on loan from Muangthong United)..

References

External links
 

1997 births
Living people
Nonthawat Klinchampasri
Nonthawat Klinchampasri
Association football midfielders
Nonthawat Klinchampasri
Nonthawat Klinchampasri
Nonthawat Klinchampasri